Javaansche Padvinders Organisatie (JPO) was a Scouting organization in the Dutch East Indies (now Indonesia). This first Indonesian Scouting organization was established on the initiative of Sri Paduka Mangkunagara VII in 1916.

Scouting came to Indonesia in 1912, as branch of the Nederlandsche Padvinders Organisatie (NPO, Netherlands Pathfinder Organisation), the first Dutch Scouting organization. After 1916 it was called the Vereeniging Nederlandsch Indische Padvinders (NIPV, Association of Dutch Indies Pathfinders).  As the Dutch East Indies, Indonesia had been a branch of the Netherlands Scout Association, yet Scouting was very popular, and had achieved great numbers and standards.

References

Further reading
 Scouting 'Round the World, John S. Wilson, first edition, Blandford Press 1959

External links
 Pine Tree Web
 Official Homepage of Scouting Nederland
 A brief history of Scouting Nederland
 Dutch Scoutwiki

Scouting in Indonesia
Scouting and Guiding in the Netherlands
Youth organizations established in 1912
1912 establishments in the Dutch East Indies